Mephenoxalone (trade names Dorsiflex, Moderamin, Control-OM) is a muscle relaxant and mild anxiolytic. It inhibits neuron transmission, relaxing skeletal muscles by inhibiting the reflex arc. As the effect of muscle relaxation, mephenoxalone affects mental condition, and is also a treatment for nervousness and anxiety.

See also 
 Chlorphenesin
 Guaifenesin
 Mephenesin
 Metaxalone
 Methocarbamol

References 

Carbamates
Drugs with unknown mechanisms of action
Oxazolidines
Phenol ethers
Methoxy compounds